Wu Quan may refer to:

Ngô Quyền (897–944), Vietnamese prefect and general
Go Seigen (1914–2014), or Wu Qingyuan, birth name Wu Quan, Chinese-born Japanese Go player

See also
Wuquan Mountain